The 2010 BWF World Championships was the 18th tournament of the World Badminton Championships. It was held at Stade Pierre de Coubertin in Paris, France, from August 23 to August 29, 2010. Following are the results of the men's singles:

Seeds

 Lee Chong Wei (quarterfinals)
 Peter Gade (semifinals)
 Lin Dan (quarterfinals)
 Chen Jin (champions)
 Taufik Hidayat (finalist)
 Sony Dwi Kuncoro (first round, retired)
 Nguyen Tien Minh (third round)
 Simon Santoso (second round)
 Boonsak Ponsana (third round)
 Bao Chunlai (third round)
 Jan Ø. Jørgensen (second round)
 Kenichi Tago (second round)
 Park Sung-hwan (semifinals)
 Chetan Anand (first round)
 Marc Zwiebler (third round)
 Wong Choong Hann (second round)

Main stage

Section 1

Section 2

Section 3

Section 4

Final stage

External links
Official website
tournamentsoftware.com

2010 BWF World Championships